Mary DeMarle is a video game writer. She is most well known for her work with the Myst and Deus Ex series of games.

Career 
DeMarle first started her writing career working in the entertainment industry. DeMarle's first credits as a video game writer was for the 2001 game Myst III: Exile. She was the lead writer of Deus Ex: Human Revolution and its 2016 sequel Deus Ex: Mankind Divided. For the former she won the 2012 Canadian Videogame Award for Best Writing.

She was the Narrative lead for the 2021 game Marvel's Guardians of the Galaxy, which she won The Game Awards 2021 Award for Best Narrative.

DeMarle is known for writing for games with multiple branching narratives.

In 2022, DeMarle joined BioWare as a senior narrative director.

Personal life 
DeMarle has a Bachelor of Science from Syracuse University in Television, Radio, and Film Production.

References

External links 
 

Video game writers
Living people
Year of birth missing (living people)
Women in the video game industry